There are at least 10 named mountains in Wheatland County, Montana.
 Bartleson Peak, el. 
 Bluff Mountain, el. 
 Cinnamon Peak (Montana), el. 
 Coffin Butte, el. 
 Elephant Rock, el. 
 Haystack Butte, el. 
 Indian Butte, el. 
 Oka Butte, el. 
 Suicide Hill, el. 
 Wild Horse Butte, el.

See also
 List of mountains in Montana

Notes

Wheatland